Sesawng is a village in Aizawl district in the Indian state of Mizoram. Nearby towns are Seling, Thingsulthliah and Khawruhlian.
The town sits on a hilltop neighboring Seling town. It is 45 km from the capital city Aizawl and is accessible by roads via Tipaimukh road.

Demographics 
As of the 2011 India census, Sesawng had a population of  spread over  households. Males constitute 50.4% of the population and females 49.6%. Sesawng has an average literacy rate of 94.82%, male literacy is 96.09%, and female literacy is 93.52%. 16.27% of the population is under 6 years of age.

References 

Aizawl
Cities and towns in Aizawl district